Elections to Birmingham City Council in England were held on 3 May 2012 on the same day as other 2012 United Kingdom local elections. One third of the council was up for election and the Labour Party gained overall control of the council from No Overall Control.

These election results are directly comparable with the corresponding elections held in 2008

Election summary

Resulting Political Composition

Ward results

References

Birmingham City Council election service (with links to results)

2012
2012 English local elections
2010s in Birmingham, West Midlands